In U.S. food regulations, an Acceptable Market Name is a set of guidelines for names of seafood sold in interstate commerce.

The Acceptable Market Names are recommendations, and not legally enforceable.

References

 Guidance for Industry: The Seafood List - FDA's Guide to Acceptable Market Names for Seafood Sold in Interstate Commerce https://www.fda.gov/Food/GuidanceComplianceRegulatoryInformation/GuidanceDocuments/Seafood/ucm113260.htm

Food law
Seafood